Protoparachronistis initialis is a moth in the family Gelechiidae. It was described by Omelko in 1986. It is found in Russia.

References

Gelechiinae
Moths described in 1986